Initiation is a concept in Theosophy that there are nine levels of spiritual development that beings who live on Earth can progress upward through.  Within these levels, there are four basic levels of spiritual development that human beings on Earth progress through as they reincarnate, although evil acts may cause bad karma which may cause one to temporarily regress.  It is believed that when souls have advanced to the fourth level of initiation, they have reached enlightenment and have no further need to reincarnate.  At the fifth level of initiation and beyond, souls  have the opportunity to become members of the Spiritual Hierarchy.  This concept was developed by both C. W. Leadbeater and Alice A. Bailey beginning in the 1920s.
  
According to C.W. Leadbeater, Initiation is a process by which "we try to develop ourselves not that we may become great and wise, but that we may have the power and knowledge to work for humanity to the best effect."  According to Alice A. Bailey, Initiation is the "process of undergoing an expansion [toward higher levels] of consciousness"  It is believed by Theosophists that all souls that have reached the fourth level of initiation and evolved beyond the necessity to reincarnate that do not elect to become pratyeka buddhas and go directly into Nirvana gradually evolve upward through all of these six higher levels of consciousness over thousands or millions of years, and later over billions or trillions of years, other higher levels yet beyond.

The concept of Initiation is also recognized in the Ascended Master Teachings, a group of religions loosely based on Theosophy.  In the Ascended Master Teachings, it is referred to as Ascension.

The first six initiations were named by C.W. Leadbeater and Alice A. Bailey after the six most important events in the life of Jesus.

According to Martin Euser, “Theosophy closes the gap between science and religion by positing reincarnation as a dynamic process [ unlike the concept of the eternal return ].  The first jewel concerns the doctrine of reincarnation or reembodiment. It's all a dynamic process and it's the way nature works.”

Initiation zero

The vast majority of ordinary humanity lies on the probationary path (below the first initiation).

First initiation ("birth" to the spiritual life)
According to Alice A. Bailey, at the first initiation one gains full control of the physical body. Bailey's student Benjamin Creme advanced a belief that there are 800,000 people at this level of initiation.

In the Ascended Master Teachings, a soul that reaches this level is referred to as having attained their Individualized "I AM" Presence, the prerequisite for further spiritual advancement.

In Buddhist tradition, First Initiation is referred as Sotāpanna (संस्कृताः - स्रोताअर्पणा, One who offers oneself to the stream (of spirituality)).

Second initiation ("baptism")
Alice A. Bailey states that at the second initiation, one gains full control of the astral body.  According to Benjamin Creme, there are 240,000 people at this level of initiation.

In Buddhist tradition, Second Initiation is referred as Sakadagami (संस्कृताः - शक्यतोअगामी, perhaps will not go/continue (will return)).

Third initiation ("the transfiguration")
An individual who is at the level of the third initiation has acquired fully developed clairvoyance and clairaudience. According to Benjamin Creme, there are somewhere between 2,000 and 3,000 people at this level of initiation.

In Buddhist tradition, Third Initiation is referred as Anagami (संस्कृताः - अनआगामी, cannot come back/return).

Fourth initiation ("the crucifixion")
An individual reaching the fourth initiation is known as the perfected one, or an Arhat (Pali) or a Paramahamsa (Sanskrit).

At this level, it is believed in Buddhism, one has the ability to remember all of one's past lives, and one also has various minor siddhis capable of affecting one's immediate environment.

Symbolically the fourth initiation is denoted as the crucifixion initiation. An Arhat is supposed to be one who does not need to be incarnated again to develop spiritually.  According to Benjamin Creme, there are 450 people at this level of initiation.

In Buddhist tradition, Fourth Initiation is referred as Arhat (संस्कृताः - अरिहंता (अरि Enemy/Vices), हंता (Killed/Conquered), One who has Conquered/killed all the enemies/vices).

"The seven choices before the perfect [hu]man"
Having reached the threshold of the fifth initiation, a soul does not necessarily have to enter Earth's spiritual hierarchy proper as one of the "Masters of the Ancient Wisdom".  One has seven paths forward to higher levels that they can choose to go forward on, only one of which is to become a "Master of the Ancient Wisdom".  These seven choices, called in Theosophical literature "the seven choices before the perfect [hu]man" are:

1.  "Remain with humanity as an official of the Hierarchy", i.e., become one of the Masters of the Ancient Wisdom.
2.  "Remain with humanity as a "Nirmanakaya", i.e., become a bodhisattva.
3.  "Join the Devas".
4.  "Join the Staff Corps of the Solar Logos", i.e., join the Masters living in etheric cities inside the Sun who supervise the activities of the Solar Angels that direct the process of evolution of the life waves (process of reincarnation) of the beings on all the planets of the Solar System (all of whom, except those on Earth, live on the etheric planes of their planets).
5.  "Prepare the work of the next Chain", i.e. join that subsection of the Staff Corps of the Solar Logos who are the solar planners who plan the future development of planetary civilizations in this solar system.
6.&7. "Enter Nirvana", i.e., become a Pratyekabuddha.

Fifth initiation ("the resurrection")
The fifth initiation, called the resurrection, comprises the first rung of beings designated in Theosophy as Masters of the Ancient Wisdom and in the Ascended Master Teachings as Ascended masters.

Siddhis at this level include the ability to teleport and bilocate moderate
distances and levitate within a localized area.

According to C. W. Leadbeater, Alice Bailey and Benjamin Creme, there are a total of 43 beings at this level of initiation; this figure is arrived at because all three have stated there are a total of 60 Masters in all—subtracting from the 60 the 17 Masters at level six and above identified by C. W. Leadbeater, leaves a total of 43 Masters of the Ancient Wisdom at the fifth level of initiation.

Of these 43 Masters, a total of 12 have been identified by name, one by C. W. Leadbeater, nine by Alice Bailey, and two by Benjamin Creme.

C. W. Leadbeater named a Master called Master Jupiter who lives in India that is involved with overseeing the people, government, and development of India that is at this level.

Alice A. Bailey identified as Masters the Master P., who is said to help St. Germain bring about the Age of Aquarius in the Americas, and two different English Masters (English Master #1 and English Master #2), one of which is said to have inspired the labor movement. In addition to these three, she identified the three Lords of Liberation – (Lord of Liberation #1, Lord of Liberation #2, and Lord of Liberation #3).  According to Alice A. Bailey, the three Lords of Liberation formulated the slogan Liberty, Equality, Fraternity.  Finally, Alice A. Bailey also identified the three Lords of Karma (Lord of Karma #1, Lord of Karma #2, and Lord of Karma #3).  These three beings are said to live in Shamballah and help Sanat Kumara decide where and when souls are going to incarnate in their next life.

Benjamin Creme identified two previously unidentified Masters at this level in 2001—he stated that there is a Master in Moscow and a Master in Tokyo, but did not give their personal names.

Forty-three minus 12 equals 31 Masters of the Ancient Wisdom at this level that are still unidentified by name.

Guy Ballard and Elizabeth Clare Prophet claimed to have identified, named, and received dictations from at least 200 new "Ascended Masters" at this level; however, these Masters are not recognized as Masters of the Ancient Wisdom by traditional Theosophists.  Ascended Masters named by Guy Ballard and Elizabeth Clare Prophet at this level include such Masters as Confucius, Lord Ling, Lady Master Magda, Pallas Athena, Lanello,  Kwan Yin, the Great Divine Director, Padre Pio,  Godfre and his "twin flame" (celestial wife) Lady Master Lotus, and many dozens more.

In Elizabeth Clare Prophet's Ascended Master Teachings, the Master Jupiter is referred to as Chananda. Also, Sanat Kumara has a grandson named Master Cha Ara who is half mortal and who just recently became a Master, functioning at the fifth level.

Sixth initiation ("the ascension" or "masterhood")
The Chohans (Lords) of the Seven Rays – Morya (1st Ray), Master Koot Hoomi (2nd Ray), Paul the Venetian (3rd Ray), Serapis Bey (4th Ray), Master Hilarion (5th Ray), Master Jesus (6th Ray), and the Master Rakoczi (7th Ray) – are seven of the beings at the level of the sixth initiation, while their coordinator and communications director Djwal Khul is another, making a total of eight at this level.

All of these Masters are recognized by both traditional Theosophists and those who believe in Elizabeth Prophet's Ascended Master Teachings.  Master Rakoczi is referred to as  St. Germain by several such groups including Prophet's and the "I AM Religious Activity".

Siddhis at this level include the ability to teleport, bilocate, or levitate to anyplace on Earth.

According to the Ascended Master Teachings, on January 1, 1956, the Master Jesus advanced from the sixth to the seventh level of initiation and the Lady Master Nada (a lady Master recognized in Prophet's works but not in Theosophy) advanced from the fifth level to the sixth level and replaced the Master Jesus as the chohan of the sixth ray.

Seventh initiation ("bodhisattva" , "avatar", or "christhood")
The seventh initiation is known as the initiation of the Bodhisattava (Buddhism) or the Avatar (Hinduism). The Maitreya or World Teacher (known as Krishna by Hindus, the Christ by Christians, Maitreya by Buddhists, Messiah by the Jews, the Iman Mahdi by Muslims, and the Peshotan by the Zoroastrians) is at this level.  At this level also are said to be the Chakshusha Manu, the Vaivasvatu Manu and the Maha Chohan, thus making a total of four beings at this level.

In  the Ascended Master Teachings, the Chakshusha Manu is referred to as Lord Himalaya.

According to Benjamin Creme, a being at this level has the ability to teleport to anyplace in the Solar System. Creme admits, however, that unless one is in a hurry, it's simpler, easier, and uses less energy to just take a flying saucer.  Creme has also stated that beings at this level have a level of invulnerability such that they would not be affected by a bullet fired at them, nor even by the detonation of a nuclear bomb.

In the Ascended Master Teachings, it is believed that on January 1, 1956, Maitreya advanced from the 7th level to the 8th level.

Eighth initiation ("buddhahood")

Level eight is the level of the Buddha.

At this level also, according to C.W. Leadbeater, are The Three Pratyeka Buddhas (the task of these three Buddhas is to focus the Seven Rays from Sanat Kumara through Djwal Khul to the chohans of the Seven Rays). Unlike Buddha, the three Pratyeka Buddhas do not interact with the human race except for fulfilling their function of focusing the seven rays.

Alice A. Bailey stated that communication among beings at this level is entirely by telepathy.  According to Theosophist Alfred Percy Sinnett, beings at this level can freely roam both in interplanetary space and in nearby interstellar space in full consciousness while physically remaining in their celestialized bodies and carrying on normal activities such as communicating with other beings.   In order for beings at this level to be able to do this, it would have been  necessary for them to have activated their transpersonal chakras.  Benjamin Creme and Elizabeth Clare Prophet have stated that beings at this level can teleport as far as the star Sirius.

This makes four beings at this level, according to traditional Theosophy.

In the Ascended Master Teachings, it is believed that on January 1, 1956, Buddha advanced from the 8th level to the 9th level, becoming co-equal with Sanat Kumara.

The three Pratyeka Buddhas have not been mentioned so far in any of the Ascended Master Teachings. Elizabeth Clare Prophet described and quoted from Buddhist sources on the Five Dhyani Buddhas of mainstream Mahayana and Vajrayana Buddhism. They focus the five inner rays which together with the seven more external rays focused by the Chohans comprise the twelve rays.

Ninth initiation ("godhood")
Level nine is the "Lord of the World": Sanat Kumara –  "The Eternal Youth" and "The Ancient of Days", the Nordic alien that is believed by Theosophists to be the "Lord of the World", i.e., the governing deity of Earth.

C.W. Leadbeater discussed the abilities of beings at this level.  He stated that Sanat Kumara's "consciousness is of so extended a nature that it comprehends at once all the life on our globe.  In his hands are the powers of cyclic destruction, for he wields Fohat [i.e. beams composed of "bubbles in space" used by Theosophical deities to materialize or dematerialize material objects] in its higher forms and can deal directly with cosmic forces outside our chain [i.e., outside our solar system]." Thus according to Leadbeater powers of beings at this level include omniscience regarding the events occurring on a single inhabited planet, materialization of large objects, and the ability to affect at a distance to some degree happenings in other nearby planetary systems.

According to the Ascended Master Teachings, Sanat Kumara has a "twin flame" (celestial wife) named Lady Master Venus who he brought with him from Venus, as well as a daughter named Lady Master Meta born to them on Venus who they brought with them to Earth, both of them presumably also functioning at the ninth level of initiation.

Tenth initiation ("silent watcher")
The tenth initiation is considered to symbolize perfection and is used to describe the Silent watcher, and specifically denoted as the Planetary Logos of Earth. In order to reach the status of a Planetary Logos, this being would have had to have been a high level Planetary Deva in some other solar system before it incarnated inside our planet at the time of the creation of the world. According to C. W. Leadbeater, the "Planetary Logos" is functioning at the tenth level of initiation and Sanat Kumara, in continuous telepathic rapport with the Planetary Logos, functions as its spokes-deity.  Since the formulation in the early 1970s by James Lovelock of the Gaia hypothesis, many Theosophists and those adherent to the Ascended Master Teachings, adopting the Gaia philosophy, nowadays simply refer to the "Planetary Logos of Earth" as Gaia, the New Age version of what in many religions is called the Earth mother..

Levels of initiation beyond the tenth level
In the theosophical teachings of Alice Bailey, there is a powerful being living inside the Sun serving the Solar Logos called the Avatar of Synthesis. Its job is to transmit the seven rays from the heart of the Sun through the seven spirits before the [solar] throne to all the life waves of the Solar System.  According to Benjamin Creme, the Avatar of Synthesis is functioning at the 17th level of initiation. In the Ascended Master Teachings, this being is called Ray-O-Light. The only master above all these levels is the Christ.

The Solar Logos itself must be at least several levels beyond the 17th level.  The Solar Logos, the Sun God in Theosophy, is personified as the cosmic beings Helios and his twin flame (celestial wife) Vesta, the "God and  Goddess of this solar system", in the Ascended Master Teachings.

Perhaps several dozen or a couple of hundred of levels above the Solar Logos would be the Galactic Logos.  In the Ascended Master Teachings, the Galactic Logos is personified as the cosmic being Averran.

C.W. Leadbeater stated, "The ladder of being [i.e., of initiation] extends upward into clouds of light, into which few of us can yet penetrate, and when we ask those who stand higher than we and know infinitely more than we do, all they can say is that it extends beyond their sight also.  They know very many more steps of it than we do, but it goes still further, onwards and upward to unimaginable heights of glory, and no one knows its end."

The number of levels of initiation ultimately would depend on the physical size of the Cosmos, because enough souls would have to climb the ladder to ensoul all the stars with stellar logoi and all the galaxies with galactic logoi, plus provide staffing for their attendant cosmic bureaucracies of angels, archangels, etc., as souls beyond them on the scale of initiation move up the ladder.  If Alan Guth's inflation theory, which states that the actual size of the Cosmos is at least fifteen orders of magnitude larger than the observable universe (itself 93,000,000,000 light years in diameter), is correct, then there could be several hundred or even thousands of levels of initiation necessary to staff the large scale structures of the cosmos before reaching the level of the Cosmic Logos. In the Ascended Master Teachings, the Cosmic Logos is personified as the cosmic beings Alpha and Omega.

If the concept of the Multiverse is true, then other hierarchies exist in other Universes.  It is believed in Theosopy that the concept of the Multiverse is true because Theosophists have stated that the Universal Logos has created many other cosmoses besides our own.

Initiation in popular culture
Music
 In 1975, Todd Rundgren released an album titled Initiation which has a song called "Initiation" on side one.  The title of the album is apparently based on the Theosophical concept of Initiation as taught by Alice Bailey and C. W. Leadbeater.  The entire second side of the album is taken up by a song called "A Treatise on Cosmic Fire"; the three parts of the song are listed as: "I. The Internal Fire, or Fire by Friction; II. The Fire of Spirit, or Electric Fire; The Fire of Mind, or Solar Fire." The second parts of these three phrases are taken directly from Alice A. Bailey's book A Treatise on Cosmic Fire.

References

Further reading
Bailey, Alice A.  Initiation, Human and Solar,  The Lucis Publishing Company (1922)
 Leadbeater, C.W. The Masters and the Path Adyar, Madras, India: 1925—Theosophical Publishing House—Chart on page 249 (diagram 5), provides details about the Great Ones functioning on initiation levels five through nine.
 Creme, Benjamin Maitreya's Mission'' Amsterdam: 1986—Share International Foundation—Chart on pages 373–393 gives the Level of Initiation of famous people of history (all the indicated levels are between one and five).

External links

 What is Initiation? M.R. Jaqua:
 List compiled by Benjamin Crème of the Level of Initiation of various famous spiritual teachers and some other famous people throughout history:

Levels of Initiation (Theosophy)
Theosophical philosophical concepts